Dimitar Koychev (born 27 March 1953) is a Bulgarian gymnast. He competed at the 1972 Summer Olympics and the 1976 Summer Olympics.

References

1953 births
Living people
Bulgarian male artistic gymnasts
Olympic gymnasts of Bulgaria
Gymnasts at the 1972 Summer Olympics
Gymnasts at the 1976 Summer Olympics
Place of birth missing (living people)